McKinley is the name of some places in the U.S. state of Wisconsin:
McKinley, Polk County, Wisconsin, a town
McKinley (community), Wisconsin, an unincorporated community
McKinley, Taylor County, Wisconsin, a town